Aitne , also known as , is a retrograde irregular satellite of Jupiter. It was discovered by a team of astronomers from the University of Hawaii led by Scott S. Sheppard, in 2001, and given the temporary designation . Aitne belongs to the Carme group, made up of irregular retrograde moons orbiting Jupiter at a distance ranging between 23 and 24 Gm and at an inclination of about 165°.

Aitne is about 3 kilometres in diameter, and orbits Jupiter at an average distance of 22,285,000 km in 712.04 days, at an inclination of 166° to the ecliptic (164° to Jupiter's equator), in a retrograde direction and with an eccentricity of 0.393.

It was named in August 2003 after Aitna or Aitne, the divine personification of Mount Etna, whose sons by Zeus (Jupiter) are the Palici, the twin Sicilian gods of geysers (other authors have them descend from Thalia and/or Hephaistos).

References

Carme group
Moons of Jupiter
Irregular satellites
Discoveries by Scott S. Sheppard
20011209
Moons with a retrograde orbit